120 Minutes (formerly The Alternative and VH1 Classic 120 Minutes) is an alternative rock music video program that debuted in August 2004 on VH1 Classic and currently airs on MTV Classic. The program follows a similar format to that of 120 Minutes, which aired on MTV from 1986 to 2003.

Following VH1 Classic's transition into MTV Classic on August 1, 2016, VH1 Classic 120 Minutes was relaunched under the name 120 Minutes on August 8, 2016. It was one of several VH1 Classic original programs to be retained by MTV Classic.

Summary and format
As with the original 120 Minutes, the series features videos from alternative rock artists, as well as those from several other related genres, including post-punk, punk rock, new wave, college rock, sophisti-pop, alternative dance, Britpop, jangle pop, power pop, dream pop, grunge, gothic rock, shoegazing and noise rock.

The VH1 Classic version of the program focused primarily on videos from the 1980s and early 1990s, with occasional videos from late-1970s and mid-1990s artists. The MTV Classic version features videos from largely the same time period, although with a focus on the late 1980s to the late-1990s. Videos dating from the 1970s and early 1980s are de-emphasized, or have been removed from the playlist entirely.

Unlike the original MTV version of 120 Minutes which featured a host introducing videos and occasional interviews and live performances, the VH1 Classic and MTV Classic versions of the program are exclusively music video blocks. The program is broadcast as two back-to-back 60 minute blocks which total the titular 120 minutes, including commercials.

VH1 Classic 120 Minutes was the final program to air on VH1 Classic before its transition to MTV Classic. In addition, the show aired VH1 Classic's final music video "Don't Talk" by 10,000 Maniacs.

The show plays a very limited number of artists and videos, often repeating the same songs week after week.

Time slot
The Alternative aired in a two-hour version early Sunday mornings at 11 with a repeat at 11 pm Eastern, with additional one-hour shows at those times on Wednesdays and Thursdays. Beginning the weekend of April 28, 2007, The Alternative was renamed 120 Minutes in honor of the classic MTV series of the same name. The series aired that weekend from 4-6 am and 1-3 am early Saturday mornings, and Sunday evenings at 9-11 pm and 1-3 am. Until August 2016, 120 Minutes aired from 4-6 am, usually on Sundays, Mondays and Thursdays. Ever since the network re-branded as MTV Classic, it airs on Mondays from 12-2 am and again at 3-5 am.

See also
 Alternative Nation

References

2004 American television series debuts
2000s American music television series
2010s American music television series
English-language television shows
MTV original programming
VH1 music shows